Events from the year 1596 in Sweden

Incumbents
 Monarch – Sigismund

Events

 - An embassy from Poland arrive to support the personal union between Sweden and Poland. 
 25 November - A peasant uprising in the province of Finland results in the Cudgel War.
 - Archbishop Abraham Angermannus organizes a religious inspection tour through the provinces to eradicate all remains of Catholicism, Paganism and other non-Lutheran practices. 
 - Sweden is afflicted with bad harvests and subsequent hunger.

Births

 1 January - Elizabeth Ribbing, morganatic consort of prince Carl Philip   (died 1662) 
 - Princess Maria Elizabeth of Sweden, princess  (died 1618) 
 - Johan Banér, Field Marshal  (died 1641) 
 - Ebba Brahe, love interest of King Gustavus Adolphus   (died 1674)

Deaths

 - Karin Hansdotter, royal lover  (born 1539)

References

 
Years of the 16th century in Sweden
Sweden